Major-General Sir William Gosset  (18 January 1782 – 27 March 1848) was a British Army officer and public servant.

Biography
Commissioned into the Royal Engineers in 1798, Gosset was secretary to William à Court's mission to the Barbary States in 1813, Member of Parliament for Truro from 1820 to 1826, secretary to Lord Anglesey as Master-General of the Ordnance from 1827 to 1828, private secretary to Anglesey as Lord Lieutenant of Ireland from 1828 to 1829, Under-Secretary for Ireland from 1831 to 1835 and Serjeant-at-Arms of the House of Commons from 1835 until his death.

References

1782 births
1848 deaths
UK MPs 1820–1826
Members of the Parliament of the United Kingdom for Truro
Royal Engineers officers
British Army major generals
Knights Bachelor
Under-Secretaries for Ireland
Serjeants-at-Arms of the British House of Commons